Thomas Martin Feeley (born 13 August 1950) is an Irish vascular surgeon and former rower. He competed in the men's coxless four event at the 1976 Summer Olympics.

Education
Feeley graduated from University College Dublin (UCD) in 1974 with a degree in medicine (MB BCh BAO). In 1979, he was conferred with the diploma of Fellowship of the Royal College of Surgeons in Ireland. He went on to take a master's degree in surgery at the National University of Ireland in 1985.

He remained involved with the UCD Boat Club as a coach in later years, and was awarded a "Graduate of the Year" sports award by the university in 2017.

In 2015, he took up the role of group clinical director at the Dublin Midlands Hospital Group, having previously been a consultant vascular surgeon and clinical director at the Adelaide and Meath Hospital, Dublin, incorporating the National Children's Hospital (now known as Tallaght University Hospital). He resigned from the role in 2020.

References

1950 births
Living people
Irish male rowers
Olympic rowers of Ireland
Rowers at the 1976 Summer Olympics
Place of birth missing (living people)